Jefferson in the U.S. state of Wisconsin may refer to:
Jefferson County, Wisconsin
Jefferson, Wisconsin, a city
Jefferson, Green County, Wisconsin, a town
Jefferson, Monroe County, Wisconsin, a town
Jefferson, Vernon County, Wisconsin, a town
Jefferson, Jefferson County, Wisconsin, a town
Jefferson Junction, Wisconsin, an unincorporated community